Carrere or Carrère may refer to:

As a name 

 Georges Carrère (1897–1986), French classical violinist
 Edward Carrere (1906–1984), Mexican art director
 Emmanuel Carrère (1957–), French author, screenwriter, and director
 Fernando Carrere (1910–1998), Mexican art director
 Hélène Carrère d'Encausse (1929–), French politician historian
 Jean-Louis Carrère (1944–), French politician
 Tia Carrere (1967–), American actress, model, and singer

Other 

 Carrère, a commune in France
 Carrere Group, a French television production and distribution company
 Carrere Records, a French record label
 HMS Carrère, an early 19th-century frigate

See also 

Carree (name)
 Carrère and Hastings